Drepana is a genus of moths belonging to the subfamily Drepaninae. The genus was erected by Franz von Paula Schrank in 1802.

Species
Subgenus Drepana Schrank, 1802
Drepana curvatula (Borkhausen, 1790)
Drepana dispilata Warren, 1922
Drepana falcataria (Linnaeus, 1758)
Drepana pallida Moore, 1879
Drepana rufofasciata Hampson, [1893]
Subgenus Watsonalla Minet, 1985
Drepana binaria (Hufnagel, 1767)
Drepana cultraria (Fabricius, 1775)
Drepana uncinula (Borkhausen, 1790)
Subgenus unknown
Drepana arcuata Walker, 1855

Former species
Drepana argenteola Moore
Drepana micacea Walker

References

External links
Family description in Richard South. The Moths of the British Isles

Drepaninae
Drepanidae genera